Christopher Allan Sayers (born 19 December 1978) is an English former first-class cricketer.

Sayers was born at Harrow in December 1978 and was educated at Millfield, before going up to Trinity Hall, Cambridge. While studying at Cambridge played first-class cricket for Cambridge University, making his debut in 1999 against Nottinghamshire at Trent Bridge. He played first-class cricket for Cambridge University until 2001, making eleven appearances. Playing as an all-rounder, he scored 103 runs in his eleven matches at an average of 11.44, with a high score of 46. He had little success with his right-arm medium-fast bowling, taking just 2 wickets from 83 overs bowled which conceded 357 runs. In 2001, Sayers also played three first-class matches for the then newly formed Cambridge UCCE side, appearing in their inaugural first-class match against Kent.

Notes and references

External links

1978 births
Living people
People from Harrow, London
People educated at Millfield
Alumni of Trinity Hall, Cambridge
English cricketers
Cambridge University cricketers
Cambridge MCCU cricketers